Warehouse Kawasaki was a five-story amusement facility in Kawasaki, Japan under Geo Corporation's  brand of themed amusement facilities and parks. It was designed to look worn down and like the former Kowloon Walled City in Hong Kong, with the design handled by now-defunct Japanese design company Hoshino-Gumi, with props imported directly from Hong Kong. It was described as being a "gloriously authentic-looking cyberpunk dystopia". It was located a ten-minute walk from Kawasaki station.

The facility featured retro games in addition to modern ones, and was also a common locale for both amateur and professional photo and video shoots, such as music videos for idol groups Keyakizaka46 ("Gomen ne Christmas") and Yumemiru Adolescence ("20xx").

The facility closed on 17 November 2019.

References

Further reading

External links 

Anata no Warehouse official website 

2019 disestablishments in Japan
Buildings and structures in Kawasaki, Kanagawa
Cyberpunk
Dystopian fiction
Video arcades